The Battle of Cape St Vincent was a minor naval engagement of the War of the Quadruple Alliance, fought on 20 December 1719 near Cape St. Vincent between a squadron of two British ships of the line and a frigate, under Commodore Philip Cavendish and a squadron of the Spanish ships of the line  Conde de Tolosa, Hermione and Nuestra Señora de Guadalupe under Don Rodrigo de Torres sent from Santander to Cádiz to avoid its capture by the Anglo-French forces patrolling the Bay of Biscay.

The Spanish squadron, which had captured a British frigate and a sloop few days before the battle, forced the British fleet to withdraw to Gibraltar with about 40 casualties after 5 hours of combat, arriving to Cádiz on 2 January 1720. Pedro Messía de la Cerda, future captain of the ship of the line Glorioso during his famous voyage carrying gold from the Spanish Main to Spain and Viceroy of New Granada, took part in the action aboard one of the Spanish ships.

Ships involved
British squadron
 HMS Norwich (50 guns)
 HMS Advice (50 guns)
 HMS Dover (40 guns)
Spanish squadron
 HMS Conde de Tolosa (64 guns)
 HMS Nuestra Señora de Guadelupe (62 guns)
 HMS Hermione (50 guns)

References

Bibliography 

Naval battles involving Great Britain
Naval battles involving Spain
Battles of the War of the Quadruple Alliance
Conflicts in 1719
1719 in Europe
1719 in the British Empire